Edijana Dafe (born 27 May 1990) is a former Swedish female handballer who played as a left wing for the Swedish national team.

International honours
European Championship: 
Bronze Medalist: 2014
Carpathian Trophy: 
Winner: 2015

References

1990 births
Living people
Handball players from Gothenburg
Swedish female handball players
Expatriate handball players